The 1940 All-Big Six Conference football team consists of American football players chosen by various organizations for All-Big Six Conference teams for the 1940 college football season.  The selectors for the 1940 season included the United Press (UP).

All-Big Six selections

Backs
 Paul Christman, Missouri (UP-1 [QB]) (College Football Hall of Fame)
 Harry Hopp, Nebraska (UP-1 [HB])
 Walter Luther, Nebraska (UP-1 [HB])
 John Martin, Oklahoma (UP-1 [FB])

Ends
 Ray Prochaska, Nebraska (UP-1)
 Bill Jennings, Oklahoma (UP-1)

Tackles
 Forrest Behm, Nebraska (UP-1) (College Football Hall of Fame)
 Bernard Weiner, Kansas State (UP-1)

Guards
 Warren Alfson, Nebraska (UP-1)
 Hal Lahar, Oklahoma (UP-1)

Centers
 Don Pierce, Kansas (UP-1)

Key
UP = United Press

See also
1940 College Football All-America Team

References

All-Big Six Conference football team
All-Big Eight Conference football teams